Athena is the debut studio album by American musician Sudan Archives. It was released on November 1, 2019 under Stones Throw Records.

The first single from the album, "Confessions" was released August 30, 2019.

Critical reception
Athena was met with universal acclaim from critics. Metacritic assigned it a weighted average rating of 83 out of 100, based on 15 reviews from mainstream publications.

Accolades

Track listing

Personnel
Sourced from AllMusic.

Sudan Archives
 Brittney Parks - vocals, violin, mandolin, synthesizer, bass, drum programming, percussion; violin arrangement

References

2019 debut albums
Sudan Archives albums
Stones Throw Records albums